The Zadar Archipelago is a group of islands in the Adriatic Sea, near the Croatian city of Zadar.

Main islands 
 Dugi Otok
 Galešnjak
 Iž
 Lavdara
 Ošljak 
 Pašman
 Rava
 Rivanj
 Sestrunj
 Tun Veli
 Ugljan
 Vir 
 Vrgada
 Zverinac

References

Islands of Croatia
Islands of the Adriatic Sea
Landforms of Zadar County